SS Robert Mills was a Liberty ship built in the United States during World War II. She was named after Robert Mills, a South Carolina architect known for designing both the first Washington Monument, located in Baltimore, Maryland, as well as the better known Washington Monument in the nation's capital, Washington, D.C..

Construction
Robert Mills was laid down on August 30, 1944, under a Maritime Commission (MARCOM) contract, MC hull 2498, by the St. Johns River Shipbuilding Company, Jacksonville, Florida; she was sponsored by Mrs. Cecil L. McCall, the wife of St. Johns River SBC's leaderman, and was launched on 5 October 1944.

History
She was allocated to the Alcoa Steamship Co., Inc. on October 14, 1944. On October 21, 1948, she was laid up in the National Defense Reserve Fleet in Mobile, Alabama. She was transferred for use as an artificial reef, May 21, 1975, to the state of Alabama. She was removed from the fleet, 28 May 1975.

References

Bibliography

 
 
 
 

 

1944 ships
Liberty ships
Mobile Reserve Fleet
Ships built in Jacksonville, Florida
Ships sunk as artificial reefs